The bare-eared squirrel monkey (Saimiri ustus) is a squirrel monkey endemic to Brazil and possibly eastern Bolivia.

References

Endemic fauna of Brazil
Mammals of Brazil
Squirrel monkeys
Mammals described in 1843
Primates of South America
Taxa named by Isidore Geoffroy Saint-Hilaire